Bearville may refer to:

Bearville, Kentucky
Bearville Township, Itasca County, Minnesota

See also
 Bearsville (disambiguation)